Glaucocharis pogonias is a moth in the family Crambidae. It was described by Turner in 1911. It is found in Australia, where it has been recorded from Queensland.

References

Diptychophorini
Moths described in 1911